Bennett's tree-kangaroo (Dendrolagus bennettianus) is a large tree-kangaroo. Males can weigh from 11.5 kg up to almost 14 kg (25 to 31 lbs), while the females range between about 8 to 10.6 kg (17.6 to 23 lbs). They are very agile and are able to leap 9 metres (30 ft) down to another branch and have been known to drop as far as 18 metres (59 ft) to the ground without injury.

Description

Like other tree-kangaroos it has longer forelimbs and shorter hindlimbs than terrestrial kangaroos and a long bushy tail. It is mostly dark brown above and lighter fawn on chin, throat and lower abdomen. The forehead and muzzle are greyish. The feet and hands are black. The tail has a black patch at the base and a light patch on the upper part. The ears are short and rounded.

Habitat
This very elusive (or "cryptic") tree-kangaroo is found in both mountain and lowland tropical rain forests south of Cooktown, Queensland to just north of the Daintree River; an area of only about 70  km by 50  km (44 miles by 31 miles). It is also occasionally found in sclerophyll woodlands. It lives almost completely on the leaves of a wide range of rainforest trees, notably Schefflera actinophylla (the umbrella tree), vines, ferns and various wild fruits.

Diet
The Bennett's tree-kangaroo is a herbivore. It mostly eats leaves off 33 different plant species.

Now that it is rarely hunted by Aboriginal Australians, its main predators are pythons and the dingo. It is thought to be the closest tree-kangaroo to the ancestral form.

Conservation status
Although the IUCN still rates the status of Bennett's tree-kangaroo as "near threatened", its numbers seem to be increasing and its range expanding. Sightings have become far more common in recent years. In 2006 a dead specimen was found along Amos Bay Road, just south of Cooktown. The increases in numbers and range are likely because most of its range is now protected under World Heritage legislation, and it is no longer hunted by Indigenous Australians. Both Roger Martin and Lewis Roberts, two of the world's top experts on this species, agree that it should now be classified as "secure."

Footnotes

References

 Cronin, Leonard (2000). Australian Mammals: Key Guide (Revised Edition). Envirobooks. Annandale, Sydney, Australia. .
 Martin, Roger, et al. (1996). Tree Kangaroos: A Curious Natural History. Reed Books, Port Melbourne, Vic., Australia. .
 Martin, Roger (2005). Tree-kangaroos of Australia and New Guinea. CSIRO Publishing, Collingwood, Vic., Australia. .

External links
Contains information and a photo of Bennett's tree-kangaroo

Bennett's tree-kangaroo
Marsupials of Australia
Endemic fauna of Australia
Mammals of Queensland
Near threatened animals
Near threatened biota of Queensland
Bennett's tree-kangaroo